Tiletamine is a dissociative anesthetic and pharmacologically classified as an NMDA receptor antagonist. It is related chemically to ketamine.  Tiletamine hydrochloride exists as odorless white crystals.

It is used in veterinary medicine in the combination product Telazol (tiletamine/zolazepam, 50 mg/ml of each in 5 ml vial) as an injectable anesthetic for use in cats and dogs.  It is sometimes used in combination with xylazine (Rompun) to chemically immobilize large mammals such as polar bears and wood bison. Telazol is the only commercially available tiletamine product in the United States. It is contraindicated in patients of an ASA score of III or greater and in animals with CNS signs, hyperthyroidism, cardiac disease, pancreatic or renal disease, pregnancy, glaucoma, or penetrating eye injuries.

Society and Culture 
Recreational use of telazol has been documented. Animal studies have also shown that tiletamine produces rewarding and reinforcing effects. Products that combine Tiletamine and Zolazepam are classified as Schedule III controlled substances in the United States. Otherwise, as noted by the DEA, tiletamine is unscheduled; “…[R]ules applicable to the scheduling of tiletamine and zolazepam as individual entities are not warranted [or in effect] at this time. Neither tiletamine nor zolazepam, as discrete substances, is perceived to pose a significant threat to the health and general welfare at this time…”

References

External links
 Erowid: Telazol

Arylcyclohexylamines
Dissociative drugs
General anesthetics
Ketones
NMDA receptor antagonists
Thiophenes